Phenacolimax atlantica is a species of air-breathing land snail, a terrestrial pulmonate gastropod mollusk in the family Vitrinidae.

This species is endemic to Portugal.

References

Molluscs of the Azores
Phenacolimax
Taxonomy articles created by Polbot
Taxobox binomials not recognized by IUCN